Wansleben may refer to:

 Johann Michael Vansleb (1635–1679), German theologian, linguist and Egypt traveller
 Wanzleben, a town in the Börde (district), in Saxony-Anhalt, Germany
 Wansleben am See, a German municipality in the Mansfeld-Südharz district
 Wansleben, a subcamp of the Buchenwald concentration camp